Horst Skoff was the defending champion but did not compete that year.

Ronald Agénor won in the final 6–3, 6–4 against Kent Carlsson.

Seeds

  Kent Carlsson (final)
  Ronald Agénor (champion)
  Lawson Duncan (quarterfinals)
  Fernando Luna (first round)
  Andres Võsand (first round)
  Martin Střelba (quarterfinals)
  Ricki Osterthun (second round)
  Francesco Cancellotti (quarterfinals)

Draw

Finals

Top half

Bottom half

External links
 1989 Grand Prix Athens Open Draw

Athens singles
ATP Athens Open